Epimetheus  is an inner satellite of Saturn. It is also known as Saturn XI. It is named after the mythological Epimetheus, brother of Prometheus.

Discovery 

Epimetheus occupies essentially the same orbit as the moon Janus. Astronomers assumed that there was only one body in that orbit (disbelieving that two moons could share nearly identical orbits without colliding), and accordingly had difficulty determining their orbital characteristics. Observations were photographic and spaced widely apart in time, so that while the presence of two objects was not obvious, the observations were difficult to reconcile with a reasonable orbit.

Audouin Dollfus observed a moon on 15 December 1966, which he proposed to be named "Janus". On 18 December, Richard Walker made a similar observation which is now credited as the discovery of Epimetheus. However, at the time, it was believed that there was only one moon, unofficially known as "Janus", in the given orbit.

Twelve years later, in October 1978, Stephen M. Larson and John W. Fountain realised that the 1966 observations were best explained by two distinct objects (Janus and Epimetheus) sharing very similar orbits. This was confirmed in 1980 by Voyager 1, and so Larson and Fountain officially share the discovery of Epimetheus with Walker. A moon that was probably Epimetheus appeared in two Pioneer 11 images and was designated 1979S1, there is uncertainty though because the two images were not enough to allow a reliable orbit to be calculated.

Epimetheus received its name in 1983. The name Janus was approved by the IAU at the same time, although the name had been used informally since Dollfus proposed it shortly after the 1966 discovery.

Orbit 

Epimetheus's orbit is co-orbital with that of Janus. Janus's mean orbital radius from Saturn is, as of 2006 (as shown by green color in the adjacent picture), only 50 km less than that of Epimetheus, a distance smaller than either moon's mean radius. In accordance with Kepler's laws of planetary motion, the closer orbit is completed more quickly. Because of the small difference it is completed in only about 30 seconds less. Each day, the inner moon is an additional 0.25° farther around Saturn than the outer moon. As the inner moon catches up to the outer moon, their mutual gravitational attraction increases the inner moon's momentum and decreases that of the outer moon. This added momentum means that the inner moon's distance from Saturn and orbital period are increased, and the outer moon's are decreased. The timing and magnitude of the momentum exchange is such that the moons effectively swap orbits, never approaching closer than about 10,000 km. At each encounter Janus's orbital radius changes by ~20 km and Epimetheus's by ~80 km: Janus's orbit is less affected because it is four times more massive than Epimetheus. The exchange takes place close to every four years; the last close approaches occurred in January 2006, 2010, 2014 and 2018. This is the only such orbital configuration of moons known in the Solar System (although, 3753 Cruithne is an asteroid which is co-orbital with Earth).

The orbital relationship between Janus and Epimetheus can be understood in terms of the circular restricted three-body problem, as a case in which the two moons (the third body being Saturn) are similar in size to each other.

Physical characteristics 
There are several Epimethean craters larger than 30 km in diameter, as well as both large and small ridges and grooves. The extensive cratering indicates that Epimetheus must be quite old. Janus and Epimetheus may have formed from a disruption of a single parent to form co-orbital satellites, but if this is the case the disruption must have happened early in the history of the satellite system. From its very low density and relatively high albedo, it seems likely that Epimetheus is a very porous icy body. There is considerable uncertainty in these values, however, and so this remains to be confirmed.

The south pole shows what might be the remains of a large impact crater covering most of this face of the moon, and which could be responsible for the somewhat flattened shape of the southern part of Epimetheus.

There appear to be two terrain types: darker, smoother areas, and brighter, slightly more yellowish, fractured terrain. One interpretation is that the darker material evidently moves down slopes, and probably has a lower ice content than the brighter material, which appears more like "bedrock". Nonetheless, materials in both terrains are likely to be rich in water ice.

Features
Craters on Epimetheus, like those on Janus, are named after characters in the legend of Castor and Pollux.

The first has been misspelled 'Hilairea' at USGS, which would presumably be pronounced .

Interactions with rings 
A faint dust ring is present around the region occupied by the orbits of Epimetheus and Janus, as revealed by images taken in forward-scattered light by the Cassini spacecraft in 2006. The ring has a radial extent of about 5000 km. Its source are particles blasted off their surfaces by meteoroid impacts, which then form a diffuse ring around their orbital paths.

Along with Janus, Epimetheus acts as a shepherd moon, maintaining the sharp outer edge of the A Ring in a 7:6 orbital resonance. The effect is more obvious when the more massive Janus is on the resonant (inner) orbit.

Gallery

References 

Notes

Citations

Sources

 
 
 
 
 
 
 
 
 
 
 
 
 
 
  (supporting online material, table S1)

External links 

 Epimetheus Profile by NASA's Solar System Exploration
 The Planetary Society: Epimetheus
 Cassini Images of Epimetheus 
 'Solar System Dynamics' by Murray and Dermott The standard text on the subject, describes the orbits in detail.
 QuickTime animation of co-orbital motion from Murray and Dermott
 Cassini image of Janus and Epimetheus near the time of their orbital swap.
 Epimetheus nomenclature from the USGS planetary nomenclature page

Moons of Saturn
Co-orbital moons
19661218
Moons with a prograde orbit